The women's 100 metres hurdles at the 1978 European Athletics Championships was held in Prague, then Czechoslovakia, at Stadion Evžena Rošického on 31 August and 2 September 1978.

Medalists

Results

Final
2 September
Wind: 0.6 m/s

Note: The final originally took place on 1 September but during its course Grażyna Rabsztyn veered off onto the neighbouring lane and caused Nina Margulina to fall down. Because of this the race was re-run a day later without Grażyna Rabsztyn, with the same athletes taking the medals in exactly the same order.

Semi-finals
31 August

Semi-final 1
Wind: -0.2 m/s

Semi-final 2
Wind: 0.2 m/s

Heats
31 August

Heat 1
Wind: -0.3 m/s

Heat 2
Wind: 1.8 m/s

Heat 3
Wind: -1.9 m/s

Heat 4
Wind: 0.4 m/s

Participation
According to an unofficial count, 23 athletes from 13 countries participated in the event.

 (1)
 (2)
 (1)
 (4)
 (1)
 (2)
 (1)
 (1)
 (1)
 (1)
 (3)
 (2)
 (3)

References

100 metres hurdles
Sprint hurdles at the European Athletics Championships
1978 in women's athletics